Théniet El Abed District is a district of Batna Province, Algeria.

Municipalities
The district further divides into three municipalities.
Teniet El Abed
Chir
Oued Taga

Districts of Batna Province